Kraševo is a village in the municipalities of Usora and Tešanj, Bosnia and Herzegovina.

Demographics 
According to the 2013 census, its population was 1,437, with 1,430 living in the Tešanj part and 7 Bosniaks living in the Usora part.

References

Populated places in Tešanj
Populated places in Usora